Bloodbrothers is a 1978 coming-of-age film directed by Robert Mulligan, and starring Richard Gere, Paul Sorvino, Tony Lo Bianco and Marilu Henner. It was based on the 1976 novel of the same name by Richard Price. It was nominated for an Academy Award for Best Adapted Screenplay.

Premise
Set in a working-class Bronx community, it tells the story of the De Coco family, a family of construction workers. Thomas is the head of the family with two sons, but one, Stony (Richard Gere) wants to be a teacher, not a construction worker. Then he accepts a job as a recreational assistant at a children's ward. Immediately, bitter divisions begin to surface.

Cast
 Paul Sorvino as Louis "Chubby" De Coco
 Tony Lo Bianco as Thomas "Tommy" De Coco Sr.
 Richard Gere as Thomas "Stony" De Coco Jr.
 Lelia Goldoni as Marie De Coco
 Yvonne Wilder as Phyllis De Coco
 Marilu Henner as Annette Palladino
 Kenneth McMillan as Mikey Banion
 Floyd Levine as Dr. Ralph Harris
 Kim Milford as Bobby Butler
 Michael Hershewe as Albert "Tiger" De Coco
 Lila Teigh as Mrs. Cutler
 Kristine DeBell as Cheri
 Robert Englund as Mott
 Gloria LeRoy as Sylvia
 Damu King as Chili Mac
 Paulene Myers as Mrs. Pitt
 Danny Aiello as Artie Di Falco
 Raymond Singer as Jackie Cutler
 Bruce French as Paulie
 Peter Iacangelo as Malfie
 Eddie Jones as Blackie
 E. Brian Dean as Brian (credited as Brian Dean)
 Randy Jurgensen as Randy
 Ron McLarty as Mac
 David Berman as Dave Stern
 Robert Costanzo as Vic (credited as Bob Costanzo)
 Edwin Owens as Stan (credited as Ed Owens)
 Tom Signorelli as Sig
 Kennedy Gordy as Tyrone
 Jeffrey Jacquet as Derek

Response
The film opened to positive reviews, and though it would be forgotten about in later years, it was liked for the ensemble cast. As one of the De Coco sons, Richard Gere was especially praised. The film also introduced Marilu Henner.

Ryan McDonald of Shameless Self Expression said: "This 1978 Robert Mulligan tale about a seriously dysfunctional Italian-American family is too broadly played, stereotyped, and overly familiar... This is all very shouty and somewhat overbearing stuff for a story that isn’t all that memorable to begin with. ... Tony Lo Bianco and especially an unrestrained Lelia Goldoni are the worst offenders. Lo Bianco, often typecast as (an) Italian-American hood, gives us a stereotype of Italian-American machismo, misogyny, occasional brutality, and just general hamminess. Occasionally there seems to be a real character in there, but largely it’s just too much of a ‘performance’...  But at least he has his moments, which cannot be said for the ghastly Goldoni, whose shrieking, mugging, wailing ... coupled with a pathetic, basically psychotic character derail the film.  ... The most enjoyable work comes from Paul Sorvino, Marilu Henner, and Kenneth McMillan..."

Awards
Nominee Best Adapted Screenplay - Academy Awards (Walter Newman)
Nominee Best Adapted Screenplay - Writers Guild of America (Walter Newman)

References

External links

1978 films
1970s coming-of-age drama films
American coming-of-age drama films
1970s English-language films
Films scored by Elmer Bernstein
Films about Italian-American culture
Films based on American novels
Films directed by Robert Mulligan
Films set in New York City
Films shot in New York City
Warner Bros. films
Films with screenplays by Walter Newman (screenwriter)
1978 drama films
1970s American films